Robert Dufour (16 August 1901 – 20 December 1933) was a French footballer. He played in one match for the France national football team in 1924.

References

External links
 

1901 births
1933 deaths
French footballers
France international footballers
Place of birth missing
Association football forwards
FC Sochaux-Montbéliard players